Heroes of the Mine is a 1913 British silent drama film directed by George Pearson and starring Percy Moran and Lionel d'Aragon.

Partial cast
 Percy Moran as Frank Conway  
 Lionel d'Aragon as Dudley Hamilton

References

Bibliography
 Quinlan, David. The Illustrated Guide to Film Directors. Batsford, 1983.

External links
 

1913 films
1913 drama films
British drama films
British silent feature films
1910s English-language films
Films directed by George Pearson
British black-and-white films
1910s British films
Silent drama films